Frederick Jones (26 August 1909 – August 1994) was a Welsh professional footballer who played in the Football League for Ipswich Town, Millwall, Swansea Town and Notts County as a centre forward.

Career statistics

References 

1909 births
1994 deaths
English Football League players
Clapton Orient F.C. wartime guest players
Welsh footballers
Association football forwards
Association football wing halves
Footballers from Pontypool
Aberaman Athletic F.C. players
Pontypridd F.C. players
Swansea City A.F.C. players
Notts County F.C. players
Millwall F.C. players
Folkestone F.C. players
Ipswich Town F.C. players
Southern Football League players
Fulham F.C. wartime guest players
Millwall F.C. wartime guest players
Watford F.C. wartime guest players
Chelmsford City F.C. players